Faugères (Languedocien: Faugièiras) is a commune in the Hérault department in southern France.

Faugères is known for its wine, Faugères AOC.

Faugères is also known for the old windmills that overlook the village from a nearby hill to the north.  One of the windmills has now been restored using ancient techniques and may be seen in operation between June and September.

History 
The castle of Faugères dates back to at least 1030AD, but it was heavily damaged during the Wars of Religion and today only small sections of the keep, the watch tower and castle wall remain.

Four Protestant churches have existed in Faugères over time and two remain today.  The most recently-built church dates from 1837 and was built with stones taken from the old castle ruins.

In the hills around Faugères are many capitelles, round dry-stone shelters with vaulted roofs, built to protect shepherds and farmers from the elements. These are many centuries old.

Population

Personalities
 Claude Abbes

See also
Communes of the Hérault department

References

Communes of Hérault